Irene Grandi (born 6 December 1969) is an Italian singer and songwriter.

During her career she has sung in Spanish and has performed duets in German, French, Indian and in African languages, selling around 5 million records and earning 9 top-ten albums and 6 top-ten singles of which one number-one on the Italian music charts. She has participated five times at the Sanremo Music Festival gaining the podium in 2000. Grandi has performed for six times at the Festivalbar, conquering twice the platform and winning the Radio Awards. In the 2009 she has won a Wind Music Award, and in 2011 a Sanremo Hit Award.

Biography
Irene Grandi was born in Florence.

She debuted in the Sanremo Music Festival in the category New Proposed with "Fuori", in 1994, which was later won by Andrea Bocelli, who was also debuting the same year.

Her first album, Irene Grandi, contained songs written with Eros Ramazzotti ("Sposati subito") and Jovanotti ("T.V.B."). In 1995, her second album, In vacanza da una vita, was released. It contained such songs as "In vacanza da una vita" and "Bum bum". These albums were followed up by Per fortuna purtroppo, Verde rosso e blu, Kose da Grandi, and Indelebile among others.

In 2000, she placed second in the Sanremo Music Festival with a song written together with Vasco Rossi.

She performed lead vocals on the song "Blue", the closing track on French producer Hector Zazou's 2003 album Strong Currents.

In 2004, she made her debut as television presenter with Marco Maccarini at the Festivalbar.

She participated as a contestant in the 60th edition of the Sanremo Music Festival in 2010 with her song "La cometa di Halley" and again in 2015 with "Un vento senza nome".

She participated at the Sanremo Music Festival 2020 with the song "Finalmente io".

Discography

Filmography
The Barber of Rio (1996)

References

External links
 Official page – irenegrandi.it 
 Warner Music Irene Grandi page 
 Irene Grandi Fanclub 
 On MySpace 
 Concert tickets, Schedule, Tour Dates – livenation.it 

1969 births
Living people
MTV Europe Music Award winners
Musicians from Florence
20th-century Italian women singers
21st-century Italian women singers